Hojjatieh Mosque is related to the Qajar dynasty and is located in the city of Khoy, in northwestern Iran.

Sources 

Mosques in Iran
Mosque buildings with domes
National works of Iran
Qajar architecture